Get It Done: Surprising Lessons from the Science of Motivation is a nonfiction book by psychologist Ayelet Fishbach, published by  Little, Brown Spark in January, 2022. Featured in the Finantial Times, Scientific American, and Fast Company, the book is a layperson's guide to understanding what motivates people to set their personal goals, what keeps them from getting to work and incrementally advancing towards their fulfillment, and what practical recommendations they may use to bridge the gap between goal setting and accomplishment.

References 

2021 non-fiction books
English non-fiction books
English-language books
Psychology books
Little, Brown and Company books